The Outlander is a Canadian drama film from Quebec, directed by Érik Canuel and released in 2005. An adaptation of Germaine Guèvremont's novel Le Survenant, the film stars Jean-Nicolas Verreault as the title character, a mysterious stranger whose arrival in the small town of Chénal-du-Moine significantly shakes up the community.

Awards
The film received five Genie Award nominations at the 26th Genie Awards:
Best Adapted Screenplay: Diane Cailhier
Best Cinematography: Bernard Couture
Best Costume Design: Francesca Chamberland
Best Sound Editing: Alice Wright, Valéry Dufort-Boucher, Alexis Farand, Jacques Plante and Christian Rivest
Best Original Song: Sylvain Cossette, Michel Corriveau and Robert Marchand, "Comme une plume au vent"
It did not win any of the awards.

References

External links

2005 films
Canadian drama films
Films directed by Érik Canuel
French-language Canadian films
2000s Canadian films